John Astor may refer to:
John Jacob Astor (1763–1848), German-born American businessman
John Jacob Astor III (1822–1890), grandson of the above, American financier and philanthropist
John Jacob Astor IV (1864–1912), nephew of the above, American businessman who died on the Titanic
John Jacob Astor, 1st Baron Astor of Hever (John Jacob Astor V, 1886–1971), grandson of the financier, American-born English newspaper proprietor and politician
John Jacob Astor VI (1912–1992), son of the Titanic victim, American socialite and shipping businessman
John Astor (1923–1987), son of the 1st Baron, English politician
Jakie Astor (Sir John Jacob Astor VII, 1918–2000), nephew of the 1st Baron, English politician and sportsman 
John Astor, 3rd Baron Astor of Hever (John Jacob Astor VIII, born 1946), grandson of the 1st Baron, English businessman and politician

See also
 Astor family